Bradley Dale Peveto (born December 28, 1962) is an American football coach. He is defensive coordinator at the University of Texas at El Paso (UTEP), a position he has held since 2021. Peveto served as the head football coach at Northwestern State University in Natchitoches, Louisiana from 2009 to 2021, compiling a record of 14–30.

Early life and playing career
Pevetogrew up in the small town of Orangefield, Texas and attended Southern Methodist University (SMU), where he played defensive back from 1982 to 1986.

Coaching career

Early coaching career
Peveto started his coaching career as the secondary coach at Trinity Valley Community College in 1987. From Trinity Valley, Peveto served as an assistant coach at Stephen F. Austin, Southern Miss, Arkansas, Northwestern State, Houston, Middle Tennessee before being hired at LSU in 2005. As part of the LSU staff, he coached the special teams and linebackers from 2005 through 2007, including the 2007 national championship team. In 2008, he was promoted to co-defensive coordinator of the Tigers, and served for one year before taking the head coaching position at Northwestern State.

Head coach at  Northwestern State
On December 18, 2008, Peveto was hired as he head football coach at Northwestern State. After a winless 2009 season, Peveto led the Demons to consecutive 5–6 seasons. On November 19, 2012, Peveto was fired as head coach of the Demons after he a 4–7 season. During his tenure at Northwestern State, he compiled an overall record of 14–30.

Head coaching record

References

External links
 UTEP profile

1962 births
Living people
American football defensive backs
Arkansas Razorbacks football coaches
Houston Cougars football coaches
Kentucky Wildcats football coaches
LSU Tigers football coaches
Middle Tennessee Blue Raiders football coaches
Northwestern State Demons football coaches
Ole Miss Rebels football coaches
SMU Mustangs football players
Southern Miss Golden Eagles football coaches
Stephen F. Austin Lumberjacks football coaches
Texas A&M Aggies football coaches
Trinity Valley Cardinals football coaches
UTEP Miners football coaches
People from Beaumont, Texas
Coaches of American football from Texas
Players of American football from Texas